"How Much I Feel" is a 1978 song by American rock band Ambrosia. The song, written by the band's guitarist/vocalist David Pack, was released in the summer of 1978 as the lead single from their third album, Life Beyond L.A., peaking at position three on the Billboard Hot 100 chart and number two for three weeks on the Cash Box Top 100.

Personnel
 David Pack – lead and backing vocals, guitars, acoustic piano, synthesizers, string arrangements
 Joe Puerta – bass, backing vocals
 Burleigh Drummond – drums, percussion, backing vocals
 Jimmie Haskell – string arrangements

Chart performance

Weekly singles charts

Year-end charts

Certifications

Covers and sampling
"How Much I Feel" was covered by English duo Alibi; it reached No. 58 on the UK Singles Chart in early 1998.

It was sampled in the song "All Your Fault" by Big Sean featuring Kanye West, the third track on the 2015 album Dark Sky Paradise.

References

External links
 

1978 songs
1978 singles
Ambrosia (band) songs
Warner Records singles
Songs written by David Pack
Rock ballads
1970s ballads